Albert Eloy (30 June 1927 in Bully-les-Mines – 8 December 2008 in Troyes) is a former French footballer. He played as defender for Sedan. With the Ardennes club, he was the winner of the Coupe de France in 1956. He repeated the achievement three years later, with Le Havre AC, the club where he finished his career. He was manager of SM Caen from 1961 to 1962. He also competed in the men's tournament at the 1952 Summer Olympics.

Playing career 

 1949–1958 : UA Sedan Torcy
 1958–1961 : Le Havre AC

Management career 
 1961–1962 : SM Caen

Honours 
 Coupe de France winner in 1956 (with UA Sedan-Torcy) and 1959 (with Le Havre AC)
 Champion of France D2 in 1959 with Le Havre AC

Notes and references

External links
 

1927 births
2008 deaths
People from Bully-les-Mines
French footballers
Le Havre AC players
CS Sedan Ardennes players
Ligue 1 players
Ligue 2 players
French football managers
Stade Malherbe Caen managers
Association football defenders
Olympic footballers of France
Footballers at the 1952 Summer Olympics
Sportspeople from Pas-de-Calais
Footballers from Hauts-de-France